Tuscola Area Airport  is a public use airport located three nautical miles (6 km) southwest of the central business district of Caro, a city in Tuscola County, Michigan, United States. It is owned by the Tuscola Area Airport Authority. It is included in the Federal Aviation Administration (FAA) National Plan of Integrated Airport Systems for 2017–2021, in which it is categorized as a local general aviation facility.

Note that CFS was assigned to Coffs Harbour Airport in Coffs Harbour, New South Wales, Australia.

Facilities and aircraft 
It has two runways: 5/23 is 4,300 by 75 feet (1,311 x 23 m) with an asphalt pavement; 12/30 is 2,300 by 110 feet (701 x 34 m) with a turf surface. The airport is not staffed regularly.

In 2022, the airport received a grant to resurface and reconstruct parts of its runway. Runway lights were also upgraded, and the airport was granted an additional 80 acres of land. There are hopes to add a new crosswind runway in the future.

The airport has a fixed-base operator that sells fuel.

For the 12-month period ending December 31, 2021, the airport had 13,870 general aviation aircraft operations, an average of 38 per day. At that time there were 31 aircraft based on the field: 30 single-engine airplanes and 1 helicopter.

Transit
The airport is accessible by road from M-81, and is close to M-24.

References

External links 
   at Michigan DOT Airport Directory
 Aerial image as of 27 March 1999 from USGS The National Map
 

Airports in Michigan
Transportation in Tuscola County, Michigan
Buildings and structures in Tuscola County, Michigan